Wim Groskamp  ( – ) was a Dutch male footballer. He was part of the Netherlands national football team, playing 1 match on 25 October 1908. He was also part of the Dutch squad for the football tournament at the 1908 Summer Olympics, but he did not play in any matches.

See also
 List of Dutch international footballers

References

External links

1886 births
1974 deaths
20th-century Dutch diplomats
Dutch footballers
Netherlands international footballers
Footballers from Amsterdam
Knights of the Order of Orange-Nassau
20th-century Dutch East Indies people
H.V. & C.V. Quick players
Association football forwards
Diplomats from Amsterdam